Callisthenia plicata is a moth of the subfamily Arctiinae first described by Arthur Gardiner Butler in 1877. It is found in the Amazon region, Peru and Espírito Santo, Brazil.

References

Lithosiini